Canistrum is a genus of plants in the family Bromeliaceae, subfamily Bromelioideae.

The genus names are from the Greek “kanistron” (a kind of basket carried on the head).

This bromeliad genus is endemic to the Atlantic Forest biome (Mata Atlantica Brasileira), located in southeastern Brazil. There are currently 22 recognized species divided into two subgenera: Canistrum and Cucullatanthus Leme.

Species
Canistrum alagoanum Leme & J.A. Siqueira - Alagoas
Canistrum ambiguum (Wand. & Leme) Wand. & B.A.Moreira - Rio de Janeiro, São Paulo
Canistrum aurantiacum E. Morren - Alagoas, Pernambuco
Canistrum auratum Leme - Bahia, Minas Gerais
Canistrum camacaense Martinelli & Leme - Bahia
Canistrum cyathiforme (Vell.) Mez  - from Bahia to Santa Catarina
Canistrum flavipetalum Wand. - Bahia
Canistrum fosterianum L.B. Smith - Bahia
Canistrum fragrans (Linden) Mabb 
Canistrum giganteum (Baker) L.B.Sm.
Canistrum guzmanioides Leme - Bahia
Canistrum improcerum Leme & J.A. Siqueira - Alagoas
Canistrum lanigerum H. Luther & Leme - Bahia
Canistrum montanum Leme - Bahia
Canistrum paulistanum (Leme) Wand. & S.E.Martins - São Paulo
Canistrum perplexum L.B.Sm.  - São Paulo
Canistrum pickelii (A. Lima & L.B. Smith) Leme & J.A. Siqueira - Pernambuco, Alagoas
Canistrum sandrae Leme - Bahia
Canistrum seidelianum W. Weber - Bahia
Canistrum superbum (Lindm.) Mez - Rio de Janeiro to Santa Catarina
Canistrum tenuisepalum (Leme) ined., - Minas Gerais
Canistrum triangulare L.B. Smith & Reitz - Espírito Santo

References

External links
FCBS Canistrum Photos
BSI Genera Gallery photos

 
Endemic flora of Brazil
Flora of the Atlantic Forest
Bromeliaceae genera